Olga G. Troyanskaya is a Professor in the Department of Computer Science and the Lewis-Sigler Institute for Integrative Genomics at Princeton University and the Deputy Director for Genomics at the Flatiron Institute's Center for Computational Biology in NYC. She studies protein function and interactions in biological pathways by analyzing genomic data using computational tools.

Education
Troyanskaya completed her Bachelor of Science degree in Computer Science and Biology at the University of Richmond in 1999 and her Ph.D. Biomedical Informatics at Stanford University in 2003.

Awards
In 2011, she was awarded the Overton Prize from the International Society for Computational Biology (ISCB).  In 2014, she was awarded the Ira Herskowitz Award from the Genetics Society of America. In 2017, she was elected as a Fellow of the ISCB. In 2020, she was elected Fellow of the Association for Computing Machinery (ACM) " for contributions to computational biology and data integration."

References

Overton Prize winners
American bioinformaticians
Stanford University School of Medicine alumni
University of Richmond alumni
Living people
Fellows of the International Society for Computational Biology
Year of birth missing (living people)
American scientists